Kuhsar Kandeh (also Romanized as Kūhsār Kandeh) is a village in Peyrajeh Rural District, in the Central District of Neka County, Mazandaran Province, Iran. At the 2006 census, its population was 598, in 145 families.

References 

Populated places in Neka County